The 2006 Campeonato Nacional Apertura Copa Banco del Estado  was the 79th Chilean League top flight, in which Colo-Colo won its 24th league title after beating Universidad de Chile on penalties, in the finals.

Qualifying stage

Scores

Group standings

Group A

Group B

Group C

Group D

Repechaje

* both teams qualified due to better position in the Regular season

Aggregate table

Playoffs

Top goalscorers

References

External links
RSSSF Chile 2006

Primera División de Chile seasons
Chile
Prim